Andrey Anatolyevich Dementyev (born 22 January 1970) is a former Russian professional football player.

Honours
 Russian Second Division Zone West best midfielder: 2005.

External links
 

1970 births
People from Novokuznetsk
Living people
Soviet footballers
Russian footballers
Association football midfielders
Russian Premier League players
FC Baltika Kaliningrad players
FC Sokol Saratov players
FC Novokuznetsk players
Sportspeople from Kemerovo Oblast